Ike & Tina Turner were an American musical duo consisting of husband and wife Ike Turner and Tina Turner. From 1960 to 1976, they performed live as the Ike & Tina Turner Revue, supported by Ike Turner's band the Kings of Rhythm and backing vocalists called the Ikettes. The Ike & Tina Turner Revue was regarded as "one of the most potent live acts on the R&B circuit."

The duo had a string of R&B hits with their early recordings "A Fool In Love", "It's Gonna Work Out Fine", "I Idolize You", "Poor Fool", and "Tra La La La La". The release of "River Deep – Mountain High" in 1966, followed by a tour of the UK with The Rolling Stones, increased their popularity in Europe. Their later works are noted for interpretive soul-infused re-arrangements of rock songs such as "Come Together", "Honky Tonk Woman", and "Proud Mary", the latter of which won them a Grammy Award in 1972. Ike & Tina Turner received the first Golden European Record Award for their international hit "Nutbush City Limits" in 1974. They released dozens of albums; their most successful being Workin' Together and Live at Carnegie Hall. Pitchfork listed their album River Deep – Mountain High among the best of its era.

Ike & Tina Turner were inducted to the Rock & Roll Hall of Fame in 1991. They have two singles inducted into the Grammy Hall of Fame, "River Deep – Mountain High" and "Proud Mary". Rolling Stone ranked them No. 2 on its list of the 20 Greatest Duos of All Time.

Career

1954–1959: Origins
In 1954, musician and bandleader Ike Turner visited his sister Lee Ethel Knight in St. Louis, Missouri. Soon after, he returned with his band, the Kings of Rhythm, to perform at Ned Love's club in East St. Louis, Illinois. Love eventually convinced Turner to relocate his band from Clarksdale, Mississippi. By 1956, Turner and his band became one of the most popular live attractions in the St. Louis and neighboring East St. Louis club scene. Prior to his move, Turner worked as a talent scout and session musician for Sun Records, Modern Records, and RPM Records. Around this time, Ann Bullock had moved to St. Louis from Brownsville, Tennessee. She began attending a predominantly African American nightclub, Manhattan Club, where she saw the Kings of Rhythm for the first time. She later recalled that she "almost went into a trance" watching Turner play.

Bullock eventually got to know Turner and his band. She began dating his saxophonist Raymond Hill, with whom she had her first child, Raymond Craig Hill (later renamed Craig Raymond Turner) born in 1958. In 1957, Bullock, who had tried to convince Turner to let her perform onstage with him, was given a microphone from the band's drummer Eugene Washington. Washington was the boyfriend of Bullock's sister Alline Bullock, who was a bartender at the club. Turner was playing B.B. King's "You Know I Love You" on the organ when Bullock chimed in. He was taken aback by her strong voice which was in contrast to her skinny frame. He asked her if she knew more songs, and by the end of the night she had joined the Kings of Rhythm. Still in high school, Bullock performed with Turner on weekends at all of the local clubs. She was one of many other vocalists, mostly male, who would front the band at times.

In 1958, Bullock sang on her first record, the Ike Turner tune "Boxtop", under the name "Little Ann". The single was released on the St. Louis label, Tune Town Records. Bullock later moved into Turner's home in East St. Louis where she was trained by him on vocal control and performance. They developed a close friendship, and acted more like "brother and sister". However, their friendship eventually turned into a romantic relationship and she became pregnant in January 1960.

1960–1965: Early success 
In March 1960, Ike scheduled his band to record a song he wrote titled, "A Fool In Love", for singer Art Lassiter. Lassiter failed to show up for the recording session at Technisonic Studios in St. Louis. Having already booked the studio time, Ike allowed Bullock to record the song as a demo with Lassiter's backing vocalists, the Artettes: Robbie Montgomery, Frances Hodges, and Sandra Harding. During a gig at the Manhattan Club in East St. Louis, Ike played the record which caught the attention of local disc jockey Dave Dixon from the radio station KATZ. Dixon asked Ike to let him send the record to Juggy Murray, the president of Sue Records in New York. Murray was impressed by Bullock's vocal delivery and bought the rights to the song. Murray offered Ike a $20,000 advance, convincing him to keep Bullock's vocals on the record and suggested that he "make her the star" of his show. This prompted Ike to rename her Tina Turner, however, family and friends still called her Ann. He then trademarked the name for protection, so that if she left he could hire another female artist and have her perform under the moniker "Tina Turner". He chose the name Tina because it rhymed with Sheena, his favorite character, Sheena, Queen of the Jungle. At first they were going to use "Ike Turner and Tina" on the record, but Murray suggested that "Ike and Tina Turner" sounded better. Tina had reservations about continuing her relationship with Ike. According to Tina, after she expressed her concern, Ike responded by hitting her in the head with a wooden shoe stretcher.

"A Fool In Love" became an immediate hit after its release in July 1960, reaching No. 2 on the Billboard Hot R&B Sides on August 15. Ike formed the Ike & Tina Turner Revue, which included the Kings of Rhythm, male vocalist Jimmy Thomas, and a trio of female vocalists called the Ikettes. As the single climbed the pop chart they went from playing in clubs to theaters such as the Apollo Theater in Harlem. On October 3, they made their first national television debut on American Bandstand when Tina was over eight months pregnant. "A Fool In Love" peaked at No. 27 on the Hot 100 on October 17, eventually selling a million copies. Journalist Kurt Loder described the song as "the blackest record to creep into the white pop charts since Ray Charles's gospel-styled 'What'd I Say' the previous summer." On October 27, Tina gave birth to their son Ronald Renelle Turner.

The success of the single was followed with another hit, "I Idolize You" and the release of their debut album The Soul of Ike & Tina Turner in February 1961. That same month, before a gig at Howard Theatre in Washington, D.C., Tina decided to have her hair bleached, but a miscue resulted in her hair falling out. To cover up the incident Ike bought Tina a wig, which became incorporated into her stage appearance. Later that year, the duo released their next hit, "It's Gonna Work Out Fine". Juggy Murray is credited as the sole producer, but the R&B duo Mickey & Sylvia also contributed to the song. It became their second million-seller, and later earned them their first Grammy nomination for Best Rock and Roll Recording at the 4th Annual Grammy Awards.

The Ike & Tina Turner Revue toured a grueling series of one-nighters throughout the United States on the Chitlin' Circuit, breaking racial barriers by performing in front of integrated audiences in the Deep South. Follow-up top 10 R&B hits in 1962 include "Poor Fool" and "Tra La La La La". Thanks to the addition of singers Stacy Johnson and Vernon Guy, Tina and the Ikettes who at this point comprised Robbie Montgomery, Venetta Fields, and Jessie Smith, began incorporating dance routines into the act. During this period, the revue build a reputation as one of the most explosive R&B ensembles. Their live performances were a musical spectacle comparable to the style of James Brown and the Famous Flames.

In 1962, Ike and Tina married in Tijuana, Mexico, and moved their entire band to Los Angeles. In November 1962, Ike and Tina filed a $330,000 joint lawsuit with Placid Music Corporation against Sue Records, Saturn Music, and Juggy Murray for "failing and refusing to give an accounting and pay certain royalties." They also charged that Sue "withheld and concealed over $100,000" of their earnings from them. Their last studio albums on Sue, Don't Play Me Cheap and It's Gonna Work Out Fine were released in 1963. In 1963, Ike purchased a home in View Park with an advance given by Murray for a renewed contract which they didn't sign. Instead, the duo signed to Kent Records; severing ties with Murray who had been their manager during their Sue tenure. When that deal failed to produce any significant hits, they signed to Loma Records and hired Bob Krasnow as their manager.

To make sure he always had a record out while on tour, Ike formed various labels such as Teena, Prann, Innis, Sony, Sonja Records. He released singles from vocalists within the revue and other groups as well. While Ike constantly recorded the revue, they performed 300 days out of the year to make up for lack of hit records. In 1964, Ike and Tina had modest R&B hits with "You Can't Miss Nothing That You Never Had" and "A Fool For A Fool". They released their first live album, Ike & Tina Turner Revue Live, on Kent in November 1964. It was their first album to chart, reaching No. 90 on the Cash Box Top 100. Their first Billboard charting album, Live! The Ike & Tina Turner Show, was released in January 1965 on Loma's parent label, Warner Bros. Records. It reached No. 126 on Billboard Top LP's and No. 8 on Hot R&B LP's in February 1965. In 1965, the duo had two top 40 Billboard R&B hits with "Tell Her I'm Not Home" and "Good Bye, So Long". Later that year, they re-signed to Sue and released the single "Two Is A Couple", which peaked at No. 15 on the Cash Box R&B chart.

Throughout 1965, the Ike & Tina Turner Revue performed on several teen rock and roll television shows including Shindig!, Hollywood A Go-Go, and American Bandstand. Phil Spector had seen them perform at a club on the Sunset Strip and invited them to appear in the concert film The Big T.N.T. Show which was filmed on November 29, 1965. By the end of the year, the official incarnation of the Ikettes abruptly left and eventually formed the Mirettes. Ike hired another set of Ikettes: Pat Arnold (a.k.a. P. P. Arnold), Gloria Scott, and Maxine Smith.

1966–1969: Career development

Eager to produce Tina, Phil Spector negotiated a deal with Ike and Tina's manager Bob Krasnow, who was head of Loma Records. Spector offered $20,000 to release them from their contract and for creative control over his sessions with Tina. After their release from Loma, they signed to Spector's Philles Records label. On March 7, 1966, Tina began recording the Phil Spector/Ellie Greenwich/Jeff Barry composition "River Deep – Mountain High" at Gold Star Studios in Hollywood. The single failed to chart successfully in the United States, reaching No. 88 on the Hot 100. The disappointing chart performance caused the album, River Deep – Mountain High, to be shelved in America where it wasn't released until 1969. However, in Britain, the song became a hit, reaching No. 3 on the UK charts. It also reached No. 1 on Los 40 Principales in Spain. Due to popular demand, Spector released the album in the UK on London Records in September 1966 with liner notes written by Decca's promotion man Tony Hall. Hall included a quote from Spector stating, "We can only assume that England is more appreciative of talent and exciting music than the U.S.".

Following their chart success in Britain, they toured with the Rolling Stones as an opening act on their 1966 UK Tour. The successful 12-date tour began at the Royal Albert Hall on September 23 and concluded on October 9 at the Gaumont Theatre. After the tour, the Turners performed at California Ballroom and toured Britain's club circuit to receptive crowds at Tiles, Ricky-Tick and the Mojo Club. When they returned to the US, they were involved in a serious bus accident while on the road in Wichita, Kansas. A few band members were hospitalized, so Turner recruited members from St. Louis to continue the tour. By 1967, the revue started to book bigger venues in the United States. They performed a series of "exclusive deals" during this period, to help increase their finances. As their careers were rising, their personal relationship was deteriorating and Tina attempted suicide before a show in 1968.

In 1968, Bob Krasnow founded Blue Thumb Records, and Ike gave him enough masters for two albums. The first album, Outta Season, was released in March 1969. It peaked at No. 43 on the Billboard R&B LP's chart. Outta Season produced the duo's cover of Otis Redding's "I've Been Loving You Too Long", which peaked at No. 23 on the R&B singles chart. In May 1969, Ike and the Kings of Rhythm released the album A Black Man's Soul on Pompeii Records. The album earned Ike his first solo Grammy nomination for Best R&B Instrumental Performance at the 12th Annual Grammy Awards.

In August 1969, the duo headlined at International Hotel's Casino Theatre in Las Vegas. It was in Vegas that Ike, who up to that point had lived a drug and alcohol free life, began using cocaine. He later recalled that he was introduced to the drug by "two famous Las Vegas headliners".

In September 1969, A&M Records reissued the album River Deep – Mountain High, and for the first time it was issued in the US. It was successful, reaching No. 28 on the R&B albums chart. The next month The Hunter was released on Blue Thumb, one of their most blues-oriented albums which features electric blues guitarist Albert Collins. The title track, "The Hunter", an Albert King cover, reached No. 37 in the R&B singles chart. The album peaked at No. 47 on the R&B albums chart, and earned Tina her first solo Grammy nomination for Best R&B Vocal Performance, Female at the 12th Annual Grammy Awards.

As the 1960s came to an end, Ike and Tina began performing at rock festivals. In 1969 they performed at the Newport Pop Festival in Northridge and the Gold Rush Festival at Lake Amador. In October, they headlined the Soul Bowl at Tulane University's Sugar Bowl Stadium; a concert to raise money for disadvantaged minority students. In November, Ike and Tina reportedly upstaged the Rolling Stones as the opening act on their 1969 US Tour. Their erotic performance of "I've Been Loving You Too Long", filmed during a concert at Madison Square Garden, is featured in the Rolling Stones' 1970 documentary Gimme Shelter. Also at Madison Square Garden, Janis Joplin joined the Turners on stage for an impromptu performance of "Land of 1000 Dances." Ike and Tina added rock songs by the Rolling Stones and the Beatles to their repertoire, which was receptive among crowds. Their new label, Minit Records, responded by releasing their rendition of "Come Together" in December 1969.

1970–1975: Mainstream success
In January 1970, Ike and Tina performed on The Ed Sullivan Show. Their performance of "Bold Soul Sister" propelled the single to No. 22 on the R&B chart. In March, their single "Come Together" peaked at No. 21 on the R&B chart. Due to the success of their singles, they were signed to Minit's parent label Liberty Records. Their next single "I Want to Take You Higher" by Sly and the Family Stone was released in May 1970. It charted higher on the Billboard Hot 100 than the original. Their first album on Liberty, Come Together, was released that same month, reaching No. 13 on the R&B albums chart. The revue's performance fee increased from $1,000 a night to $5,000 a night following their successful run. In July, they headlined the Newport Jazz Festival in Rhode Island and the Schaefer Music Festival at New York's Central Park. That Summer, they were featured in the Isley Brothers concert film It's Your Thing and they filmed Miloš Forman's Taking Off (1971). Later that year, they made their first trip to Asia to perform in Siam, China, Japan, and the Philippines.

Ike and Tina began performing "Proud Mary" by Creedence Clearwater Revival during their shows in 1969. Ike wasn't fond of the original song, but he liked the cover version by Checkmates, Ltd. Ike and Tina released their version on the album Workin' Together in December 1970. Set at first to a slow acoustic rendition sung softly by both Ike and Tina, the song then transformed into a frenetic rock and soul dervish led by Tina and the Ikettes. The single was released in January 1971, reaching No. 4 on the Hot 100 and No. 5 on the R&B chart. It sold more than a million copies, becoming the duo's best-selling single to date and won them a Grammy Award for Best R&B Vocal Performance by a Group at the 14th Annual Grammy Awards. Workin' Together became their most successful studio album, peaking at No. 25 on the Billboard 200 and No. 3 on the R&B chart. It includes the duo's social conscious title track, "Workin' Together", "Funkier Than A Mosquita's Tweeter" penned by Tina's sister Alline Bullock, and notable covers such as "Get Back" and "Let It Be" by the Beatles.

In January 1971, Ike and Tina embarked on a European tour which included dates at Midem in Cannes, the Palais d'Hiver in Lyon, and the Olympia in Paris. Their performances received rave reviews. The conservative Le Monde described Ike and Tina as "the voice of desire". Their concert at the Olympia was recorded and released as the album Live In Paris. While in Paris the Turners received the French Jazz Academy Soul award.

Ike and Tina participated in the concert celebrating Ghana's 14th Independence Day on March 6, 1971. The concert was filmed and released as Soul To Soul in theaters in August 1971. The following month the soundtrack Soul To Soul was released which featured the Turners. The album peaked at No. 10 on the Billboard Soul LP's chart.

In May 1971, Ike and Tina were the opening act for Johnny Mathis at Caesars Palace in Las Vegas; performing for the first time in a main showroom at the hotel. Earlier in the year Liberty Records was absorbed into United Artists Records, where Ike and Tina would remain as a duo. Their first release for the label was the live album, What You Hear Is What You Get, recorded during their concert at Carnegie Hall in April 1971. It peaked at No. 25 on the Billboard 200 and No. 7 on the R&B chart. The album was certified Gold by the RIAA in 1972. In July 1971, Ike and Tina filmed a concert during the Schaefer Music Festival at Central Park. It aired as Good Vibrations from Central Park on ABC-TV in August 1971. Also in 1971, they had a top 40 R&B hits with "Ooh Poo Pah Doo" and "I'm Yours (Use Me Anyway You Wanna)".

In February 1972, the Turners officially opened their recording studio, Bolic Sound, to the public. The facilities had already been in use for Turner productions since 1970. A few months later they released the album Feel Good. Nine out of the ten tracks on the album were written by Tina. In August, they performed at Nassau County's first major rock festival, Festival of Hope Rockfest, at Roosevelt Raceway to benefit crippled children. In October, they performed "It's Gonna Work Out Fine" on The Tonight Show Starring Johnny Carson, which was included on the album Here's Johnny: Magic Moments From the Tonight Show. The duo had moderate R&B chart success with the Tina penned "Up in Heah" in 1972 and a cover of Little Richard's "Early One Morning" in 1973.

In August 1973, they released their hit record "Nutbush City Limits" which as written by Tina. It peaked at No. 22 on the Billboard Hot 100 and No. 11 on the R&B chart. The single was even more successful in Europe, reaching No. 4 in the UK and No. 1 in Austria. It was also a top 5 hit in several other countries. In 1974, the Turners received the Golden European Record Award, the first ever given, for selling more than one million records of "Nutbush City Limits" in Europe. Their follow-up singles "Sweet Rhode Island Red" and "Sexy Ida" did well on the R&B chart and in Europe.

In April 1974, Ike and Tina released the album The Gospel According to Ike & Tina Turner. A few months later in August, Tina released her first solo album titled Tina Turns the Country On!. Both albums received Grammy nominations at the 17th Annual Grammy Awards. Their gospel album was nominated for Best Soul Gospel Performance. Ike also earned a solo nomination for his single "Father Alone". Tina was nominated for Best R&B Vocal Performance, Female for her solo album.

In early 1975, Gerhard Augustin, co-founder of Beat-Club and former head of A&R at United Artists in Munich, became Ike and Tina's manager. He had previously co-produced a few of their singles and the album Feel Good (1972). In 1975, Tina starred as the Acid Queen in the rock opera film Tommy. To capitalize off her publicity surrounding the film, a solo album by Tina was released titled Acid Queen. The lead single "Baby, Get It On" became the duo's last charting single together, peaking at No. 31 on the R&B chart. It was a hit in Europe where the Turners had a strong following, reaching No. 20 in Belgium and No. 9 in the Netherlands.

1976–1978: The end of the duo
By 1976, Ike's cocaine addiction had caused a hole in his nasal septum, leading to nosebleeds from which he would relieve himself by using more of the drug. In March 1976, Ike and Tina headlined at the Waldorf Astoria in New York City. They also signed a deal with CBS-TV for nine television shows revolving around the Ike & Tina Turner Revue with the possibility of it becoming a regular series. Ike was planning for them to leave United Artists for a new record company, Cream Records, for a reported annual amount of $150,000. The contract had a key person clause, meaning they would have to sign it in four days, keeping Tina contractually tied to Ike for five more years.

On July 1, 1976, the Ike & Tina Turner Revue flew to Dallas, Texas where they had a gig at the Dallas Statler Hilton. While en route to the hotel, the Turners got into a physical altercation in the car. Soon after their arrival, Tina fled to the nearby Ramada Inn and later hid at several friends' homes. On July 27, 1976, Tina filed for divorce on the grounds of irreconcilable differences. Years later in her 1986 autobiography I, Tina: My Life Story, she alleged that Ike had abused her throughout their marriage. Ike claimed in his 1999 autobiography, Takin' Back My Name: The Confessions of Ike Turner, that Tina initiated their final fight by purposely irritating him so that she would have a reason to break up with him before they were scheduled to sign their new contract.

Their divorce was finalized on March 29, 1978. In the settlement, Tina gave Ike her share of their Bolic Sound recording studio, publishing companies, real estate, and he kept his four cars. Tina retained her songwriter royalties from songs she had written, but Ike received the publishing royalties for his compositions and hers. She also kept her two Jaguars, furs and jewelry along with her stage name. Tina took responsibility for the debts incurred from their missed concert dates as well as an IRS lien.

United Artists responded to the abrupt split by finishing albums from their last recording sessions, releasing Delilah's Power (1977) and Airwaves (1978). In 1980, Ike released the single "Party Vibes"/"Shame, Shame, Shame" taken from The Edge (1980). The single peaked at No. 27 on the Billboard Disco Top 100 chart.

After Tina's resurgence as a solo artist in the mid-1980s, compilation albums containing unreleased material were released, including Get Back (1985) and Gold Empire (1985). Get Back reached No. 189 on the Billboard Top Pop Albums chart.

Awards and nominations
Ike & Tina Turner were inducted into the Rock & Roll Hall of Fame in 1991, and the St. Louis Classic Rock Hall of Fame in 2015. They've each received a star on the St. Louis Walk of Fame. Tina received a star on the Hollywood Walk of Fame in 1986. She is also inducted into the SoulMusic Hall of Fame, the Memphis Music Hall of Fame, and the Rock & Roll Hall of Fame as a solo artist. Additionally, she is a 2005 recipient of the Kennedy Center Honors. Ike is inducted into the Blues Hall of Fame, the Rhythm and Blues Music Hall of Fame, the Mississippi Musicians Hall of Fame, and Hollywood's RockWalk.

Ike & Tina Turner received the following awards:

 1971: Top Duo of the Year for their single "Proud Mary" from Hit Parade
 1971: Top Duo (Singles) from Record World DJ Poll
 1971: Best Duo from NATRA (The National Association of Television and Radio Announcers)
 1971: French Jazz Academy Soul Award
1971: Prix Otis Redding from the Académie du Jazz for best R&B album (Workin' Together)
 1974: Golden European Record Award, the first ever given for selling over one million records of "Nutbush City Limits"

Grammy Awards 
Ike & Tina Turner won a Grammy Award for "Proud Mary" in 1972. Two of their songs, "River Deep – Mountain High" and "Proud Mary" were inducted to the Grammy Hall of Fame in 1999 and 2003, respectively. Tina won an additional seven Grammys as a solo artist; Ike won one as a solo artist in 2007. Tina received the Grammy Lifetime Achievement Award in 2018.

|-
|1962
|Ike & Tina Turner – "It's Gonna Work Out Fine"
|Best Rock & Roll Recording
|
|-
|1970
|Tina Turner – The Hunter
|Best Female R&B Vocal Performance
|
|-
|1970
|Ike Turner – A Black Mans Soul
|Best R&B Instrumental Performance
|
|-
|1972
|Ike & Tina Turner –  "Proud Mary"
|Best R&B Vocal Performance by a Group
|
|-
|1975
|Tina Turner – Tina Turns The Country On!
|Best Female R&B Vocal Performance
|
|-
|1975
|Ike Turner – "Father Alone"
|Best Soul Gospel Performance
|
|-
|1975
|Ike & Tina Turner – The Gospel According to Ike & Tina
|Best Soul Gospel Performance
|
|}

Grammy Hall of Fame

|-
| 1999
| "River Deep – Mountain High"
| Hall of Fame (Single)
| 
|-
| 2003
| "Proud Mary"
| Hall of Fame (Single)
|

Living Blues Awards

!
|-
| 2014
| Ike and Tina Turner, On the Road 1971-72
| Best Blues DVD of 2013
| 
|style="text-align:center;" rowspan="1"|
|-
| 2017
| Ike & Tina Turner, The Complete Pompeii Recordings 1968-1969
| Best Blues Album of 2016 (Reissue Recording)
| 
|style="text-align:center;" rowspan="1"|
|-

Rankings 

Rolling Stone ranked Proud Mary: The Best of Ike & Tina Turner No. 212 on their list of the 500 Greatest Albums of All Time (No. 214 on 2012 revised list)
Rolling Stone ranked "River Deep, Mountain High" No. 33 on the list of the 500 Greatest Songs of All Time
NME ranked "River Deep, Mountain High" No 37 of their list of the 500 Greatest Songs of All Time
Rolling Stone ranked Ike & Tina Turner No. 2 on their list of the 20 Greatest Duos of All Time
Pitchfork ranked River Deep – Mountain High No. 40 on their list of the 200 Best Albums of the 1960s

Billboard
Billboard Year-End charts are a cumulative measure of a single or album's performance in the United States, based upon the Billboard magazine charts.

Cash Box
Cash Box magazine was a weekly publication devoted to the music and coin-operated machine industries which was published from July 1942 to November 16, 1996. It was one of several magazines that published charts of song popularity in the United States. In 1961, they began a year-end survey complied from their weekly Top 100 Best Seller list.

Record World
Record World magazine (1946–1982) was one of the three main music industry trade magazines in the United States, along with Billboard and Cash Box. The Record World Awards were an annual award given to most successful artists in the US.

Selected discography

Studio albums 

 1961: The Soul of Ike & Tina Turner 
 1962: Dynamite!
 1963: Don't Play Me Cheap
 1963: It's Gonna Work Out Fine
 1966: Get It – Get It
 1966: River Deep – Mountain High
 1968: So Fine
 1969: Outta Season
 1969: Cussin', Cryin' & Carryin' On
 1969: The Hunter
 1970: Come Together
 1970: Workin' Together
 1971: 'Nuff Said
 1972: Feel Good
 1973: Let Me Touch Your Mind
 1973: Nutbush City Limits
 1974: The Gospel According to Ike & Tina
 1974: Sweet Rhode Island Red
 1977: Delilah's Power
 1978: Airwaves
 1980: The Edge

Live albums 

 1964: Ike & Tina Turner Revue Live
 1965: Live! The Ike & Tina Turner Show
 1967: The Ike & Tina Turner Show (Vol. 2)
 1969: In Person
 1970: Festival of Live Performances
 1971: Live In Paris
 1971: What You Hear Is What You Get—Live at Carnegie Hall
 1973: Live! The World of Ike & Tina

Compilation albums 

 1965: The Greatest Hits of Ike & Tina Turner
1966: The Soul of Ike & Tina
1976: Greatest Hits
 1985: Get Back
1985: Golden Empire
 1991: Proud Mary: The Best of Ike & Tina Turner
1997: Bold Soul Sister: The Best of the Blue Thumb Recordings
2000: The Kent Years
2002: Funkier Than a Mosquito's Tweeter
2004: His Woman, Her Man: The Ike Turner Diaries
 2007: The Ike & Tina Turner Story: 1960–1975
2016: The Complete Pompeii Recordings 1968–1969

Video albums 

 1986: The Ike & Tina Turner Show
 1999: The Best of MusikLaden Live
 2004: The Legends Ike & Tina Turner Live in '71
 2009: Nutbush City Limits

Filmography
 1966: The Big T.N.T. Show
 1970: Gimme Shelter
1970: It's Your Thing
 1971: Soul To Soul
 1971: Taking Off
1971: Good Vibrations from Central Park
1975: Poiret est à vous 
2012: Ike & Tina On The Road: 1971–72

References

Sources

External links

 Ike & Tina Turner on Rock & Roll Hall of Fame
 Ike & Tina Turner on History of Rock 'n' Roll
Ike & Tina Turner on AllMusic

 
1960 establishments in Missouri
1976 disestablishments in Texas
Married couples
African-American musical groups
African-American rock musical groups
American blues musical groups
American funk musical groups
American musical duos
American soul musical groups
Grammy Award winners
Sue Records artists
Kent Records artists
Warner Records artists
Modern Records artists
Loma Records artists
Tangerine Records artists
Capitol Records artists
London Records artists
Philles Records artists
Pompeii Records artists
Blue Thumb Records artists
Minit Records artists
A&M Records artists
Liberty Records artists
United Artists Records artists
Sonja Records artists
Male–female musical duos
Rock music duos
Music of St. Louis
Musical groups established in 1960
Musical groups disestablished in 1976
Musical groups from St. Louis
Musical groups from Missouri
American rhythm and blues musical groups
Nightclub performers
Rhythm and blues duos